Haynes is a hamlet in central Alberta, Canada within Lacombe County.

The hamlet takes its name from nearby Haynes Creek.

Demographics 

See also 
List of communities in Alberta
List of designated places in Alberta
List of hamlets in Alberta

References 

Hamlets in Alberta
Designated places in Alberta
Lacombe County